Joseph Paul Opatz (born July 23, 1952) is an American politician in the state of Minnesota. He served in the Minnesota House of Representatives.

References

1952 births
Living people
People from St. Cloud, Minnesota
Democratic Party members of the Minnesota House of Representatives